Amelia C. Voght is a fictional character appearing in American comic books published by Marvel Comics. The character is most commonly associated with the X-Men franchise.

A mutant with the ability to turn her body into mist, Amelia was a love interest of Professor X before he founded the X-Men. Unable to believe in his mission, she eventually joined Magneto’s Acolytes, becoming one of Magneto's most-trusted lieutenants.

Publication history
Created by Scott Lobdell and John Romita Jr., she first appeared in Uncanny X-Men #300 (May 1993).

In her first appearance, it was hinted that Amelia Voght was a former student of Professor X who declined to join his original X-Men team. But 9 issues later a different story emerged.

Fictional character biography
Amelia was a nurse who cared for Charles Xavier after his legs were first injured. Stationed in Tibet, Amelia was glad to see another American and her positive and friendly attitude helped Xavier to get over the depression he developed when his legs were injured. At first their relationship was professional, but it soon became romantic. They left Tibet together and Amelia returned with Xavier to the United States. Xavier, also a mutant, had encountered Magneto and the Shadow King and was developing a machine called Cerebro to track mutants, hoping to protect and educate them, so they wouldn't turn into a threat. Amelia found the plans and thought that Xavier was developing the machine to hunt down and exterminate mutants. She revealed herself as a mutant and attacked him, only stopped when Xavier revealed his own mutant powers. This link strengthened their relationship even more, but over time they both developed different stances on human-mutant interaction. Xavier wanted co-existence with the humans, while Amelia thought it was best for mutants to stay underground. When Xavier brought Scott Summers to his mansion for training, Amelia left him, telling him that his plans for the X-Men would doom all mutants. Xavier attempted to use his telepathy to convince her otherwise, but stopped himself. Amelia noticed and felt betrayed.

Acolytes
She would stay hidden for the next few years, but when human-mutant relationships deteriorated, she was recruited by Fabian Cortez and became a member of the second lineup of the Acolytes, followers of Magneto, whom she had met with Xavier years before. As one of the older and more experienced mutants, she was given a position of seniority within the group, even though she didn't agree with some of the Acolytes' more extreme policies, like the killing of humans, though initially she advocated it in the case of Moira MacTaggert. Over the years she would support the Acolytes and Magneto, but she would also try to limit casualties and gave limited aid to the X-Men and other superheroes like Quicksilver who opposed them.

She eventually became disillusioned with the Acolytes' extremist stance and left the group, ending her services assisting Magneto with his rule on Genosha by working against him to help the X-Men free the captured Professor X.

Amelia returned to work as a nurse and is also one of a handful of mutants to retain their powers following the events of M-Day.

Messiah Complex/X-Men: Legacy
Wolverine, Storm and Nightcrawler seek her out during the Messiah Complex crossover to obtain information regarding the Acolytes. At first she's reluctant to speak, fearing the Acolytes will kill the X-Men. However, she relents and reveals them the location of her former comrades. Voght eventually rejoins the Acolytes after the Professor's apparent death. She also informs Omega Sentinel of recent events that took place after she returns to normal following her possession by Malice. She also reveals she still has some feelings for Professor X in the X-Men: Legacy series.

Voght is seen again when Professor X returns to New Avalon and convinces Exodus to disband the Acolytes and find a new way to help mutantkind. After this, Voght, along with Random and Omega Sentinel, decide to relocate to San Francisco.

She has since joined Magneto's new Brotherhood of Mutants.

Powers and abilities
Amelia Voght is a mutant possessing the power of transubstantiation, enabling her to convert matter into a psionically resonant vapor at will. This mist became Amelia's natural state after her powers manifested, and she is capable of transubstantiating herself or any person or object in her line-of-sight. Being insubstantial, Amelia can use this power to avoid injury. She can control the flow of the vapor through the air, allowing her to fly, squeeze herself through tight passages, or move objects about; she could pull a person out from under a mob attacking them by dispersing and reforming them nearby, or steal her opponents' weapons by vaporizing from their hands and bringing them to her own. Voght's mist can also be transported through the astral plane, allowing her to employ her powers for long range teleportation. She is able to transport herself and anything else she transubstantiates across the surface of the globe in an instant, or to and from orbit around the planet. She can teleport with cargo, or send objects to a new location without traveling with them, providing she can visualize the new location in her mind. On certain occasions, Voght even demonstrated the ability to summon distant people to herself by teleportation, visualizing wherever the person is at the moment, seeing them converted into mist, and then bringing that mist into her presence to be reformed.

In other media

Television
 Amelia Voght first appears in the two-part X-Men episode "Sanctuary Part 1", voiced by Susan Roman. Voght—a former friend of the X-Men's leader, Charles Xavier—is a member of X-Men nemesis Magneto's followers, the Acolytes. Voght lives on the Acolytes' orbital base, Asteroid M, and participates in the events surrounding fellow Acolyte Fabian Cortez's betrayal of Magneto. Later, Voght returns to Earth and becomes a doctor, working alongside X-Men ally Moira MacTaggert. When the extraterrestrial Phalanx attacks, Voght helps the X-Men defeat the invader.

References

External links
 Amelia Voght at Marvel.com
 UncannyXmen.net Spotlight On Amelia Voght

Characters created by John Romita Jr.
Characters created by Scott Lobdell
Comics characters introduced in 1993
Fictional nurses
Marvel Comics mutants
Genoshans
Marvel Comics characters who can teleport
Marvel Comics female supervillains